Fergus Gordon Anckorn (10 December 1918 – 22 March 2018) was a British soldier who, as starting as the conjurer Wizardus at age 18,  was the longest-serving member of the Magic Circle.

Anckorn was born on 10 December 1918 in Dunton Green and educated at The Judd School in Tonbridge. At the age of eighteen, he became the youngest member of the Magic Circle. During World War II, he served in the British Army, was captured by the Japanese during the fall of Singapore, and forced, as a prisoner of war, to work on the Burma Railway and the famous bridge on the River Kwai.

He was interviewed about his war experiences.
He died of bladder cancer on 22 March 2018 aged 99.

References

1918 births
2018 deaths
British magicians
British Army personnel of World War II
British World War II prisoners of war
Deaths from bladder cancer
Royal Artillery soldiers
World War II prisoners of war held by Japan
Deaths from cancer in England
Burma Railway prisoners
People from Sevenoaks District